In the physical sciences, the wavenumber (also wave number or repetency) is the spatial frequency of a wave, measured in cycles per unit distance (ordinary wavenumber) or radians per unit distance (angular wavenumber). It is analogous to temporal frequency, which is defined as the number of wave cycles per unit time (ordinary frequency) or radians per unit time (angular frequency).

In multidimensional systems, the wavenumber is the magnitude of the wave vector. The space of wave vectors is called reciprocal space. Wave numbers and wave vectors play an essential role in optics and the physics of wave scattering, such as X-ray diffraction, neutron diffraction, electron diffraction, and elementary particle physics. For quantum mechanical waves, the wavenumber multiplied by the reduced Planck's constant is the canonical momentum.

Wavenumber can be used to specify quantities other than spatial frequency. For example, in optical spectroscopy, it is often used as a unit of temporal frequency assuming a certain speed of light.

Definition
Wavenumber, as used in spectroscopy and most chemistry fields, is defined as the number of wavelengths per unit distance, typically centimeters (cm−1): 

where λ is the wavelength. It is sometimes called the "spectroscopic wavenumber". It equals the spatial frequency. A wavenumber in inverse cm can be converted to a frequency in GHz by multiplying by 29.9792458 (the speed of light in centimeters per nanosecond). An electromagnetic wave at 29.9792458 GHz has a wavelength of 1 cm in free space.

In theoretical physics, a wave number, defined as the number of radians per unit distance, sometimes called "angular wavenumber", is more often used:

When wavenumber is represented by the symbol , a frequency is still being represented, albeit indirectly. As described in the spectroscopy section, this is done through the relationship , where s is a frequency in hertz. This is done for convenience as frequencies tend to be very large.

Wavenumber has dimensions of reciprocal length, so its SI unit is the reciprocal of meters (m−1). In spectroscopy it is usual to give wavenumbers in cgs unit (i.e., reciprocal centimeters; cm−1); in this context, the wavenumber was formerly called the kayser, after Heinrich Kayser (some older scientific papers used this unit, abbreviated as K, where 1K = 1cm−1). The angular wavenumber may be expressed in radians per meter (rad⋅m−1), or as above, since the radian is dimensionless.

For electromagnetic radiation in vacuum, wavenumber is directly proportional to frequency and to photon energy. Because of this, wavenumbers are used as a convenient unit of energy in spectroscopy.

Complex
A complex-valued wavenumber can be defined for a medium with complex-valued relative permittivity , relative permeability  and refraction index n as:

where k0 is the free-space wavenumber, as above. The imaginary part of the wavenumber expresses attenuation per unit distance and is useful in the study of exponentially decaying evanescent fields.

Plane waves in linear media
The propagation factor of a sinusoidal plane wave propagating in the x direction in a linear material is given by

where

 phase constant in the units of radians/meter
 attenuation constant in the units of nepers/metre
 frequency in the units of radians/metre
 distance traveled in the x direction
 conductivity in Siemens/metre
 complex permittivity
 complex permeability
 
The sign convention is chosen for consistency with propagation in lossy media. If the attenuation constant is positive, then the wave amplitude decreases as the wave propagates in the x direction.

Wavelength, phase velocity, and skin depth have simple relationships to the components of the wavenumber:

In wave equations
Here we assume that the wave is regular in the sense that the different quantities describing the wave such as the wavelength, frequency and thus the wavenumber are constants. See wavepacket for discussion of the case when these quantities are not constant.

In general, the angular wavenumber k (i.e. the magnitude of the wave vector) is given by

where ν is the frequency of the wave, λ is the wavelength, ω = 2πν is the angular frequency of the wave, and vp is the phase velocity of the wave. The dependence of the wavenumber on the frequency (or more commonly the frequency on the wavenumber) is known as a dispersion relation.

For the special case of an electromagnetic wave in a vacuum, in which the wave propagates at the speed of light, k is given by:

where E is the energy of the wave, ħ is the reduced Planck constant, and c is the speed of light in a vacuum.

For the special case of a matter wave, for example an electron wave, in the non-relativistic approximation (in the case of a free particle, that is, the particle has no potential energy):

Here p is the momentum of the particle, m is the mass of the particle, E is the kinetic energy of the particle, and ħ is the reduced Planck constant.

Wavenumber is also used to define the group velocity.

In spectroscopy
In spectroscopy, "wavenumber"  refers to a frequency which has been divided by the speed of light in vacuum usually in centimeters per second (cm.s−1): :

The historical reason for using this spectroscopic wavenumber rather than frequency is that it is a convenient unit when studying atomic spectra by counting fringes per cm with an interferometer : the spectroscopic wavenumber is the reciprocal of the wavelength of light in vacuum:

which remains essentially the same in air, and so the spectroscopic wavenumber is directly related to the angles of light scattered from diffraction gratings and the distance between fringes in interferometers, when those instruments are operated in air or vacuum. Such wavenumbers were first used in the calculations of Johannes Rydberg in the 1880s. The Rydberg–Ritz combination principle of 1908 was also formulated in terms of wavenumbers. A few years later spectral lines could be understood in quantum theory as differences between energy levels, energy being proportional to wavenumber, or frequency. However, spectroscopic data kept being tabulated in terms of spectroscopic wavenumber rather than frequency or energy.

For example, the spectroscopic wavenumbers of the emission spectrum of atomic hydrogen are given by the Rydberg formula:

where R is the Rydberg constant, and ni and nf are the principal quantum numbers of the initial and final levels respectively (ni is greater than nf for emission).

A spectroscopic wavenumber can be converted into energy per photon E by Planck's relation:

It can also be converted into wavelength of light:

where n is the refractive index of the medium. Note that the wavelength of light changes as it passes through different media, however, the spectroscopic wavenumber (i.e., frequency) remains constant.

See also
Spatial frequency
Refractive index
Zonal wavenumber

References

Wave mechanics
Physical quantities
Units of frequency